The Norfolk Police Department (NPD) is the primary law enforcement agency servicing 242,803 people within  of jurisdiction within Norfolk, Virginia.

Homeland Security Division
The Homeland Security Division, comprising the Harbor Patrol Unit, Special Operations Team, and Bomb Squad, serves the department and citizens by maintaining a state of preparedness for emergency response to critical incidents, terrorism and other security threats.

 Harbor Patrol Unit The Harbor Patrol Unit is responsible for ensuring safe flow of waterborne critical assets transiting the Norfolk Harbor. They also focus on recreational boating through the enforcement of state and city codes.
 Special Operations Team The SOT is responsible for a rapid ready response to critical incidents outside the training and weapons capability of the patrol divisions such as hostage rescue, barricaded suspects, tubular assaults, active threats, high-risk arrest/search warrants, narcotics search warrants, vehicle take-downs, and maritime operations.
 Bomb Squad The Bomb Squad is responsible for providing a rapid, technical response to calls for service involving real or suspected explosives and explosive devices; to provide additional resources to the Homeland Security Division; and to provide training and instruction to the NPD in the recognition of, and response to situations involving explosives.

Administrative Services

Personnel Division
The Personnel Division is responsible for maintaining departmental personnel records, coordinating the department's disability management program, overseeing police recruitment processes, and coordinating the Master Police Officer Program.

Training Unit The Training Unit is responsible for improving job performance and proficiency, the meeting or exceeding of the Department of Criminal Justice Service's (DCJS) training standards and requirements, improving the quality of training with organizational goals in mind and to ensure the department's philosophy and mandates are clearly understood.
 Citizens’ Police Academy and CPAAAN The Citizens' Police Academy is responsible for providing Norfolk residents information about the NPD and how it works. The Citizens’ Police Academy Alumni Association of Norfolk, CPAAAN, is offered to graduates of the Citizens' Police Academy, where members support law enforcement throughout Norfolk.

Strategic Management Division
The Strategic Management Division formulates, evaluates, and monitors the policies, and procedures, that support the department in achieving its vision and mission. They are also responsible for managing the department's directives system consisting of general orders.

Central Records Division
The Central Records Division is responsible for a repository for criminal histories, correspondence, fingerprints, photographs, incident and accident reports, and all warrants.

Warrant Unit The Warrant Unit is responsible for processing felony and misdemeanor warrants, Circuit Court indictments, PB15 parole/probation violation papers, capiases, magistrate summonses, and other legal documents, issued by courts or magistrates.
Technology Support Unit The Technology Support Unit is responsible for the coordination of the security and administration of the Virginia Criminal Network, the police department record management system, LINx security and system administrators, and acts as the security liaison for the City Information Technology Department.

Crime Prevention Unit
Neighborhood Watch
Business Watch
Civic Leagues
Security Surveys
Safer by Design
Environmental Crimes
Speaker's Bureau
Special Programs
Police Athletic League
Police Explorers’ Post 191
Seniors Programs
Crime Prevention for the Hispanic Community

Investigative Services
Detective Division The Detective Division is responsible for investigating felony and serious misdemeanor crimes occurring within Norfolk's jurisdiction and to identify, arrest, and present offenders to the judicial system.
Vice and Narcotics Division The Vice and Narcotics Division is responsible for investigating cases involving narcotics activities throughout the City of Norfolk and consists of the Narcotics Unit and the Street Enforcement Unit.
COMPSTAT COMPSTAT stands for management accountability in policing through Computerized Statistics
Crime Analysis Unit The Crime Analysis Unit is responsible for supporting the operational elements and the administration of the Police Department by collecting, analyzing, and disseminating information on crime pattern detection, crime-suspect correlation, target profile analysis, and forecasting crime potential, trends, and patterns.

Field Operations
Norfolk is divided into 2 precincts, each consisting of three sectors.

K-9 Unit The K-9 Unit is responsible for the augmenting operations of the three patrol divisions through a complement of dog teams on patrol.
Traffic Unit The Traffic Unit consists of motorcycles, marked, and unmarked patrol units. It also has control over the school crossing guards assigned to schools throughout the city.

Rank structure

Sworn personnel

Non-sworn personnel

Misconduct
As a matter of policy, the department does not tell the public what if any disciplinary actions it takes against is officers.

In early 2011, Detective Robert Glenn Ford was sentenced to more than twelve years in prison for taking bribes from criminals. Ford was the detective who questioned the Norfolk 4 who were unjustly imprisoned for twenty years for rape and murder. The men's lawyers said they had been intimidated into confessing by the police.

In January 2014, a woman was mauled by a Norfolk police dog, requiring forty-three stitches. The police chief admitted his officers used excessive force and the city settled for almost $200,000. Four policemen left the department as a result of this attack but were never charged.

On 7 May 2016, Officer Justin Benson was driving at more than seventy miles per hour on city streets when he struck a car, killing its driver. The officer was violating the department's policy on the maximum speed to be used when responding to a call. He was not charged.

In July 2016, the City agreed to pay one and a half million dollars to settle a lawsuit involving a drunk driver who was shot by a policeman. The City did not admit any legal responsibility in the settlement.

Fallen officers
Since the establishment of the Norfolk Police Department, 39 officers have died in the line of duty.

See also

 List of law enforcement agencies in Virginia

References

External links

Norfolk Sheriff's Office
Norfolk government

Government of Norfolk, Virginia
Municipal police departments of Virginia
1797 establishments in Virginia